A multikernel operating system treats a multi-core machine as a network of independent cores, as if it were a distributed system.  It does not assume shared memory but rather implements inter-process communications as message-passing. Barrelfish was the first operating system to be described as a multikernel.

See also
Amoeba distributed operating system
Barrelfish
Distributed operating system
eMCOS
HarmonyOS

References

Distributed operating systems
Operating system kernels